is a nationally designated Place of Scenic Beauty and Natural Monument  on the border Yuzawa and Tōkamachi, Niigata Prefecture, Japan.

Kiyotsu-kyō is a canyon located on the Kiyotsu River with a total length is 12.5 kilometers within the Jōshin'etsu-kōgen National Park. The canyon is regarded as one of the three major canyons in Japan, along with the Kurobe Gorge and the Osugidani Gorge. A hot spring resort, the Kiyotsukyō Onsen, is located at the entry to the gorge and attracts a large number of visitors especially during autumn foliage season. There is a pedestrian tunnel with a total length of 750 meters along the wall of the gorge for sightseers. Formerly, there was a climbing path along the side of the river, but it was closed after a rockfall in 1988

See also
List of Places of Scenic Beauty of Japan (Niigata)

References

External links

 Tōkamachi tourist center site

Geography of Niigata Prefecture
Places of Scenic Beauty
Natural monuments of Japan
Canyons and gorges of Japan
Tourist attractions in Niigata Prefecture
Yuzawa, Niigata
Tōkamachi, Niigata
IUCN Category III